Thitarodes ferrugineus is a species of moth of the family Hepialidae. It was described by D.R. Yang in 1993, and is known from Yunnan, China.

References

External links
Hepialidae genera

Moths described in 1993
Hepialidae